Setiawangsa LRT station is an elevated rapid transit station in Ampang, Malaysia, forming part of the Kelana Jaya Line (formerly known as PUTRA). The station was opened on June 1, 1999, as part of the line's second segment encompassing 12 stations between Masjid Jamek station and Gombak (not including Sri Rampai station) and an underground line.

Location

Setiawangsa station is situated in Ampang and near the Kuala Lumpur city limits, north from the commercial core of the city along Jalan Jelatek, which borders the hilly areas of Semarak to the west and a housing estate officially known as AU1 (also known as Taman Keramat Permai) to the east. The station takes its name from Taman Setiawangsa, a large housing estate just northeast up Jalan Jelatek, from which Jalan Jelatek meets at an intersection with Jalan Setiawangsa and Jalan Taman Setiawangsa. The station thus serves the localities of AU1, Semarak and Taman Setiawangsa, as well as enclosed areas.

Design
As an elevated station, Setiawangsa station contains three levels: The access points at street level, and the ticket area and adjoining platforms on the two elevated levels. All levels are linked via stairways, escalators and elevators designated for disabled passengers. The station utilises a single island platform for trains travelling in both directions of the line, and is entirely sheltered by a gabled roof supported by latticed frames.

Bus services

References

See also

 List of rail transit stations in Klang Valley

Kelana Jaya Line
Railway stations opened in 1999
1999 establishments in Malaysia
20th-century architecture in Malaysia